The following is a list of Wu-Tang Clan's associated acts and affiliates, known as the Killa Beez, and the Wu Fam. At times, they are directly funded, supported, or produced by Clan members, are formed as extension groups originating from Clan members, or close to the Clan.

Groups

Wu-Tang Killa Beez
The Wu-Tang Clan has many affiliates who receive support, financial and otherwise, from within the Clan. These are collectively known as the Wu-Tang Killa Beez (a.k.a. Killa Beez). The association of these artists with the Clan varies greatly, and include solo artists as well as groups.

1.4.0. Productions 
1.4.0. Productions is a team of producers from Staten Island. The group consists of Sean Sulivan (a.k.a. shorte), T Diddy, Just 1, Chapel and Cheesey Rat (a.k.a. Charles Walker). The group releases mixtapes/bootlegs with affiliates rapping.

A.I.G.
A.I.G. is a duo composed of Allah Wise (a.k.a. The Wizard), and Darkim Be Allah. The group, whose name stands for "Allah Is God", debuted on the Wu-Tang Killa Bees: The Swarm compilation with the track "Bronx War Stories". An album titled Retaliation Strike was completed but was never released, a situation which eventually caused the group to leave the Clan and pursue an independent route.

They released their debut Fame Labs Presents in 2005. Stefano and Mike joined the group in 2011 as interns, but quickly escalated, with songs accounting for their daily trials and tribulations as interns. In 2012, Stefano and Mike were offered to continue their careers at A.I.G. on a full-time basis.

Achozen

American Cream Team
The American Cream Team were created in 1999. They consist of Chip Banks (died 2000), Polite (who would join Rae's second group Ice Water Inc.), Lord Superb (who was featured on Rae and Ghost albums), Twiz (who would later become part of Ghost's Theodore Unit), Triflyn (St. Lunatics affiliate and DJ for Nelly), RhymeReck, and producers Arkatech Beatz. Raekwon featured American Cream Team on two songs on his second album Immobilarity. Much of that album was produced by Arkatech Beatz and Triflyn. They were notably a Clan member's first offspring crew. The group also made several appearances on mixtapes and compilations, including a track titled "It's Not A Game" produced by Arkatech Beatz on the soundtrack to the film Black and White which was played over the film's credits, and a track on Funkmaster Flex's The Mix Tape, Vol. III mixtape. Members of the group also made appearances on albums by Raekwon's fellow Clansmen Ghostface Killah's Supreme Clientele. After 50 Cent dissed the Wu, along with others, on his infamous track "How to Rob", Polite and Lord Superb responded with a track called "Who the Fuck is 50 Cent?" followed by Raekwon's Clyde Smith skit off of Ghostface Killah's album. Before Chip Banks' death, he worked on several songs including "Ain't Nobody" (featuring Billystone), "Club Life", "Everywhere We Go", "Hold Your Head", "Heavyweight Champion", "World Order" (featuring Outlawz), "Flashbacks" & "Niggas Don't Die". Banks died on 9 December 2000 due to a shooting over a money dispute, and Cream Team split up. Like many Wu affiliates, American Cream Team completed an album, "Only In America", but it has never been released (despite being advertised in the liner notes of other Wu-Tang releases). Since then, Lord Superb & Twiz have been incarcerated, though both were finally able to release a few official mixtapes. Rhyme Recka continues to record solo material and released an album titled The Autobiography of Rapper X in 2008.

Black Knights

One of the many Wu-affiliates to debut on The Swarm compilation, the Californian group Black Knights was originally associated with the group North Star (also from California) with whom they recorded as Black Knights of the North Star. However, the groups have since separated. The group originally consisted of Crisis, Doc Doom (deceased), Rugged Monk and Holocaust. Holocaust changed moniker to Warcloud and left the group in 2001 to concentrate on a solo career and his many collaborations outside the Wu-empire, which include a long-running fellowship with underground collective Da Monstar Mob (w/ producer Skarekrow) and, in 2006, Blue Sky Black Death.

In 2001, the Black Knights released their debut album in only promo form Every Night Is A Black Knight with limited distribution, and also reunited with NorthStar for the closing song (titled "Black Knights of the North Star") on NorthStar's debut album. In 2005, they re-released their debut to worldwide distribution through CHAMBERMUSIK.com. Doc Doom was shot and killed in Compton, CA, on February 11, 2007. A compilation album of old and new material appeared in 2010. Their song "Caught Up" was in the 2007 anime television series Afro Samurai in episode 3 with a slightly different beat and added instrumentation. Rugged Monk and Crisis recorded a trio of albums along with Red Hot Chili Peppers guitarist John Frusciante: The Medieval Chamber, The Almighty, and Excalibur.

Birdz Of Prey B.O.P (Born Cipher Power)

Group Consists Of Former & Current Members Phoenix Flame, J-9, Vooodu, Joey IcePick, Nat Burnah, Battlestar, Chinaman, Voltron, Blaqe Diamond, General Jihad, I Cypha The God , Mainframe The God-Is , Karnage Ca$hman, MUGGZ7. "Born Cipher Power" is a "Wu Tang" Affiliated Group created on the West Coast in Watts California, This Group was originally 9 members deep and was based in Watts California and has went thru 3 metamorphose stages changing members and the signature name from Birdz of Prey to Born Cipher Power and co existed with both names as an alternative for the fans but has always adorned the moniker of B.O.P. aka Seraphim Gang demonstrating Love,Truth,Peace,Freedom,& "Justice"!!!!!!!

Hat 2 Da Back Productions
Started in 2007 with WuTang Latino's Sandro Rosario and helped promote Ray Roq and reggeton groups Los Yo Yais, Rameses, Fly and Polzino, and bachata group Nueva Era for the WuTang Latino movement, Michaelangelo “DJ Saint” Reyes of Orlando, Florida, is still in production and released “Let her Leave” by Personal Tactics in 2008.
Joining the WuTang Latino movement in the reggeton arena.

Black Market Militia

Consists of Killah Priest (Sunz Of Man), Tragedy Khadafi, William Cooper, Timbo King (Royal Fam) and Hell Razah (Sunz Of Man).

Brooklyn Zu
A group closely affiliated with Ol' Dirty Bastard. The group includes King Merdy (Murdoc), Raison the Zu Keeper, 12 O'Clock, Buddha Monk, Shorty Shitstain.  They released an album in 2008 titled Chamber #9, Verse 32. Murdoc and 12 O'Clock were murdered in Portland, Oregon, in 2021.

C.C.F. Division
A group consisting of Freemurda, ShaCronz and Terra Tory. They had features on RZA's Birth of a Prince and appeared on Popa Wu's Visions of the Tenth Chamber in 2000.

Da Manchuz
A group affiliated with Buddha Monk and Brooklyn Zu. The group consists of Drunken Dragon, Espionage (deceased), War, Babyface Fensta, Chilli Black, Lee-Major, G-Note$, Professor King Bean (deceased), and Born U Majesty. They released one album, Manchuz Dynasty, in 2007.

Dirty Clanzmen
A group affiliated with Brooklyn Zu formed by Dungeon Masta. The group consists of Dungeon Masta, Dizzy Dizasta, Manny Macgyver, Struxx Denali, Lex Bi-Polar (deceased), Eddi3 Hizpanik, Karnage Ca$hMan, Smuve Massbeatz, Sage Badweather, Elijah Divine, Ern Dawg and Matt Bastardo.

In 2009 Dungeon Masta released the first project "Dungeon Masta Presents Da Dirty Clanzmen" Meet The Family Vol 1 distribution through Sohlopro Records / Chambermusik Special Products as an introduction of what is to come. In 2016 Dirty Clanzmen released their debut album "The Dirty Truth" on audiomack one year after the released of the mixtape compilation "Dirty Clanzmen presents The X Tape" on Sohlopro Records / Chambermusik Special Products. Dirty Clanzmen re-released "The Dirty Truth" in 2020. The Latest project they released is titled "The Legacies Project"

The Formation of Dirty Clanzmen came in 2007, Three years after the death of Old Dirty Bastard. Dungeon Masta handpicked the emcees one by one until the group was finalized. Dirty Clanzmen mission is a tribute to the memories of Old Dirty Bastard, Popa Wu, Murdoc,12 O'Clock, Allah Real and all the fallen Soldiers of the 10th Chamber While establishing themselves as a powerhouse in the industry.

Deadly Venoms

GP Wu

Gravediggaz

Harlem 6
A group, also known as Harlem 6 Wu-Tang, whose name pays tribute to the memory of the Harlem Six (six men from Harlem, New York, who were put on trial in March 1965.) The main members are God "AGR" Harrison, Lord "Black Jesus" Harrison, Ruben "Young Man" Rosario, and Omar "Khilly Mo" Daniels.
There are also supporting members.

Hillside Scramblers
A group affiliated with U-God. Their original members included King Just, Leatha Face, Inf-Black, Kawz, Desert Eagle, Black Ice & singer Autumn Rae. Members now consist of Leatha Face, Inf-Black, Kawz, & Desert Eagle. They released their debut album, U-Godzilla Presents The Hillside Scramblers, in 2004. Leatha Face released his debut mixtape Dog Will Hunt through Chambermusik and is working on his debut album.

House Gang
A group affiliated with Inspectah Deck and made up of rappers D.C., La Banga, P.C., Carlton Fisk and Fes Taylor. They released one project in 2004 titled UndaDogz Vol. 1: House Gang Animalz and have appeared on other mixtapes including the "Back to Sicily" mixtape of Hanz On collectively in 2012.

Ice Water Inc.
A group consisting of Cigar, Polite, Stumik and P.C. They were featured on Raekwon's third album, The Lex Diamond Story. Raekwon unveiled their debut album Polluted Water via Babygrande Records in 2007. The album featured guest appearances from Wu members Raekwon and Method Man, as well as other appearances from Busta Rhymes, DJ Paul of Three 6 Mafia, Pimp C, Rick Ross, Jagged Edge, and Remy Ma.

Cigar left the group for unknown reasons and was replaced by D.C. The crew has since grown to include Hanz On, who released a diss track to Joe Budden and his crew after their collective altercation. They are also featured on the 2009 Raekwon compilation release Raekwon: Babygrande Recordings.

K.G.B.
K.G.B. (short for Klik Ga Bow) is a group made up of rappers Asiatic, Ill Knob, Raheem, and DJ Kin. They released a few singles and appeared on songs by other Wu-Tang affiliates.

Killarmy

Maccabeez

Killah Priest's group who were introduced and featured heavily on his second album View From Masada. Originally composed of Killah Priest, Daddy Rose and Salahudin, the group is now composed of Killah Priest, Timbo King, and Hell Razah. Hot Flamez, who is now known as Hah Flamez and Mista Blessington, is also a close affiliate of the group.

M.M.O.
A group made up of rappers Bam-Bam, Itchy Fingas Sha, Trigg-nomm, Pearl Handles, and Naisha. They released their first album All About the Money in 2003.

Northstar

Orphanage
A group consisting of members 4th Disciple, Beretta 9, Lord Superb, associate of Rae, Ghost, and ShoGun Assason. Not to be confused with the underground group associated with Definitive Jux and Rhymesayers Entertainment.

Othorized F.A.M.
A group consisting of members Shawn Wigs, Lounge Lo, Molly Q, and Crunch Lo. They had gained an underground following and are known mostly through their affiliation with Cappadonna, who is Lounge Lo's brother.

Royal Fam

School of the Gifted
School of the Gifted is an experimental musical project consisting of four main members with a fifth hidden member. Formally known as Illuminati Network (a.k.a. Wuminat), this group is fronted by Wu-Syndicate's Napoleon and consists of Solomon Childs, Dexter Wiggle from Westcoast Killa Beez and UK artist Shaka Amazulu.

The concept was inspired by the Marvel comics group of superheroes known as Illuminati, which sees the heroes join forces and work secretly behind the scenes in Marvel Comics' main shared universe to save the world. Each of members of SOTG from different parts of the world all adopting new alter egos and all coming from different ties and groups working behind the scenes in the Wuniverse (Wu-Tang Killa Beez shared universe) to save hip-hop. A trilogy album is in works, and Rubbabandz, formally from the group GP WU, is a rotating member of the project.

Stone Mecca

Sunz of Man

Tha Beggas
Washington D.C. natives Tha Beggas, at times confused with the spelling The Beggaz, is a collective of hip-hop artists and groups that was featured on The Swarm album on a song called On The Strength. Some of the artists include Long Axe (Black Lotus), Dragonfly (Black Lotus), Mega Soul, Scorpion, Samo Heung, Begga Ooh, Longfist, Bolo Gah (Actual Facts), Buda Love (Actual Facts), Jim Kelly (Black Lotus), Majik Sword, Yukon Black (Short Axe) and Father Lord (deceased).

Before Lord's death, he was featured on Killah Priest's "Tai Chi" along with Hell Razah and 60 Second Assassin off the album "Heavy Mental" and Sunz Of Man's "Sign Of The Time" along with Timbo King of Royal Fam. Two prominent songs that have leaked since his return are "Get Something" & "Deadly Act" (featuring his younger brother Prince Hasaan). One of Lord's many aliases is Wu-Chi. Lord was killed in a car accident on June 13, 1997. Some members of the group have also released projects under the name Hidden Aspects. There have also been solo projects from Dragonfly, Long Axe, Bolo, Begga Ooh, Samo Heung (under the name Sammy Bravo) and Short Axe (under the name Yukon Black).  Bolo (King Cee), the producer of "On the Strength" released the first collaborative album from the group titled "Blood Sweat and Years".

Theodore Unit

T.M.F.
Mentored by Ghostface Killah, the group consisted of Trife Da God, Tommy Whispers and Kryme Life. Kryme Life and Trife are members of Ghostface's group Theodore Unit, which effectively superseded T.M.F. They have continued to record in couples and as solo artists.

Two On Da Road
A group composed by 12 O'Clock, Prodigal Sunn. They made numerous guest appearances on various Wu-Tang Clan affiliates albums like Return to the 36 Chambers, Iron Flag and The Great Migration.

Universal Zu Disciplez
A group mentored by Buddha Monk (Brooklyn Zu); they are part of the Zu Bulliez family. The group was born as an off branch of Brooklyn Zu. They consist of Nahbi Reality, Lex-Supa, BxYungGz, Popsoundz, Mike Boston, DG Kash, Deus & Danjah Da Hood. They also have very close ties with the Wu-Tang OG Popa Wu.

Wu-Syndicate

Yellow Jacketz
The group are all members of Wu-Tang's West Coast Killa Bees. They released their first track on the Pollen Swarm 3 album: Roll With Killa Bees. The group consists of, Supreme I-Self, Meko (R.I.P.), Armel, Shaddow Law, Skratch, General Jihad and Ramith.

Zu Ninjaz
An Ol' Dirty Bastard affiliated group composed of 5 Foot Hyper Sniper, Black Lantern, Celo, D.L., Hook Ninja, K-Blunt, Ninja Scroll, Popa Chief, Rambo, Raw, and Shaheed. The group released their first album Now Justice in 2005.
K Blunt died on Sept 13, 2021.

Rappers

9th Prince

12 O'Clock
Along with 4th Disciple and others, 12 O'Clock was one of the Wu affiliates whose connections to the group went back to before their fame. He assisted behind the scenes in the making of the Clan's debut album and made a few guest appearances on Wu-related albums since, including on the Clan's group album Iron Flag in 2001. 12 O'Clock performed with Ol' Dirty Bastard on the track "Ol' Dirty's Back" (from the soundtrack to the 1995 film Tales from the Hood), while his duet with Raekwon, "Nasty Immigrants", appears on the soundtrack to the 1996 film The Nutty Professor. He was a member of the Brooklyn Zu clique and also made up half the duo 2 On The Road with Prodigal Sunn. He was shot and killed August 10, 2021.

His birth name is Odion Turner; he was also known as Billy Box. He appeared on "Protect Ya Neck II: The Zoo", Ol' Dirty Bastard, Return To The 36 Chambers: The Dirty Version (1995), "Wu Blood-Kin", La The Darkman, Heist Of The Century (1998); "Ghetto Syringe", Wu-Syndicate, Wu-Syndicate (1999); "Chrome Wheels", Wu-Tang Clan, Iron Flag (2001); "Rough Cut", GZA, Legend of the Liquid Sword (2003); "It's My Life" & "Manhunt", Prodigal Sunn Return of the Prodigal Sunn (2005) and Bronze Nazareth's "The Great Migration".

Armel
Armel is a member of Ancient Coins, A&R and The Cra-Z 88z. He was signed to GZA's label Liquid Swords Entertainment. He made his first high-profile appearance on the track "Rough Cut" on GZA's album Legend of the Liquid Sword in 2002. He formed the group A&R with Sharecka of Royal Fam. He released Armel Presents: Ancient Coins in 2003.

Beretta 9

Bronze Nazareth

Buddha Monk
A member of Brooklyn Zu who has worked prolifically as a rapper and producer for Wu-Tang affiliates including Da Manchuz and Zu Ninjaz. Buddha Monk has released The Prophecy (1998), Unreleased Chambers (2008) and The Dark Knight (2013), as well as various mixtapes.

Cilvaringz

Darkim Be Allah
Darkim Be Allah (born February 11, 1976) formed A.I.G. with AllahWise and released their self-titled debut-album in 2005 on Fame Labs Records. Mostly known for producing RZA solo song from The Gravediggaz' album The Pick, The Sickle & The Shovel in 1997. In 2000, he released an 8-track EP called Live at the Lab: Take 1 through mp3.com. 2008 saw Fame Labs release The Manhattan Project, a compilation which heavily featured Darkim Be Allah. Live At The Lab: Take 2 is a 15-track album produced by Darkim and featuring various members of the Fame Labs crew including AllahWise, 36Zero and Darkim.

DJ ACE NYC
DJ, Artist, and Producer, part of the Sunz Entertainment Group founded by Prodigal Sunn of the group Sunz Of Man.

Don Staten
A cousin of Ol' Dirty Bastard. He is the main rapper of the 2017 new Wu-Tang generation.

Dr. Ama Aka Dark Skinned Assassin
A Wu Fam member.

Dreddy Krueger
A rapper with a birth name of James Dockery. He was affiliated at one time with both United Kingdom and Royal Fam but is now retired from rapping, concentrating his attention on being the A&R for most Wu-Tang members. He is heavily involved with the Wu-Tang's business and promotion, while running his own label: Think Differently Music. Think Differently released the compilation Wu-Tang Meets The Indie Culture in 2005, which featured Wu-Tang members and affiliates collaborating with well-known independent/underground hip hop artists. They further released a double disc album Wu-Tang: The Lost Anthology in 2007. He continued to work for compilations and side projects under the Wu's greater team. His name is derived from the horror film legend Freddy Krueger.

Dungeon Masta
A Brooklyn Zu fam member. He is affiliated with Ol' Dirty Bastard and Popa Wu. He is a producer and rapper signed to Popa Wu Records and currently under Wu Tang Management. As a producer, he has produced two tracks on Popa Wu's Visions of the 10th Chamber ("New And Improved" ft Buddha Monk and Da Manchuz and "Sundown" ft United Kingdom and Cuffie Crime Family). In 2005, he released his first solo project titled Project Oblivion with collaboration from Buddha Monk through Chambermusik/Duck-lo Records. Dungeon Masta produced much of the album. In 2007, three years after the passing of Ol' Dirty Bastard, Dungeon Masta formed the group Dirty Clanzmen in honor of him and his legacy. He has released various projects under his own label, Soh-Lo Pro Records, through Chambermusik Special Products. In 2008, Dungeon Masta Featured on Popa Wu's Visions of the 10th Chamber Part II along with labelmate Free Murda and various artists. Dungeon Masta has toured with Wu Tang Clan members Ol' Dirty Bastard before his death and Cappadonna. Dungeon Masta has also appeared on various Wu affiliated projects Solomon Childs Wu Tang 4 Life, Krumbsnatcha's The Resurrection of the Golden Wolf and many more. In 2019, Dungeon Masta released two singles, Hard To Breathe and Internal Bleeding, along with re-releasing the album Dirty Clanzmen - The Dirty Truth; In 2022, Dungeon Masta Has Released Multiple Projects Dirty Clanzmen - The Legacies Project and his latest solo project Dungeon Masta - T.M.T.A. he is currently working on new projects to be released on his new label Iron Flag Records.

Free Murda
The son of Popa Wu and cousin of Ol' Dirty Bastard, RZA and GZA, Free Murda debuted in 1999 on Popa Wu'sVisions of the 10th Chamber with his partner Shacronz as the Cuffie Crime Family, or 'CCF Division'. He also appeared on the 2008 sequel Popa Wu's Visions of the 10th Chamber Part II. Free Murda and Shacronz also featured on the Wu-Tang Killa Beez' 2002 album The Sting ("Hatin' Don't Pay"), RZA's album Birth of a Prince ("We Pop", "The Drop Off" and "Wherever I Go") Prodigal Sunn's 2005 album Return Of The Prodigal Sunn, and Think Differently's 2005 release Wu-Tang Meets The Indie Culture ("Cars On The Interstate").

Free Murda also appeared on the Derailed original soundtrack ("Really Want None"), Cappadonna's album The Yin & The Yang ("Revenge"), Northstar's self-titled album ("We Got It" and "See Me"), and on Masta Killa's Made In Brooklyn on the track "East MCs". He released his debut solo album, Let Freedom Reign, in 2007 on Cleopatra Records.

Hanz On

Hell Razah

Intell
Dontae Hawkings, a.k.a. Intell (stylized as iNTeLL), is the son of U-God. He has released several mixtapes.

Islord

Jackpot Scotty Wotty 
Scotty Wotty is a little-known Wu-Affiliate. He was going to be an original member of the Wu-Tang Clan but ended up breaking off from the group for unknown reasons. GZA describes him in words: "His name is Jackpot, but his name was Scotty Wotty then. Actually, we started rhyming at the same time out in Shaolin – we were in the 6th grade. I taught him, he always gives me credit for that. When I moved from Shaolin in like ‘80, ‘81, ’82, his name was all over that borough". He featured on U-God's albums Dopium, Keynote Speaker and Venom.

JoJo Pellegrino 
A Staten Island native formerly signed to Violator records. Has worked and been featured on various Wu-Tang related projects.

Killah Priest

Killa Sin

Krumbsnatcha
Krumbsnatcha was formerly a member of the Gang Starr Foundation. Krumbsnatcha was then signed by John "Mook" Gibbons under the Wu-Tang Management. Krumbsnatcha released the single Killer in Me in 1999 which debuted at  42 on the Billboard charts. In October 2001 Krumbsnatcha made a collaboration with M.O.P., placing on the Billboard charts at  27. He placed on the Billboard charts again in 2002, debuting at  47 in the first week with Respect All Fear None.

LA the Darkman

Lord Superb
Originally a member of Raekwon's Cream Team, he became close with Ghostface Killah and his crew. He appeared on Rae and Ghost albums, standing out particularly in Supreme Clientele. He has since cut ties with the Wu, and served time in jail. He has brashly stated that he gave Ghost his style, and felt abandoned when Rae's Cream Team came to an end. He has since released official mixtapes. In October 2018, Lord Superb died at the age of 41.

Lounge Lo
Also known as Lounge Mode, he is Cappadonna's younger brother and a member of the Othorized F.A.M., he is formally signed to Code Red Entertainment. Lounge has been connected with the Wu since their beginning; his earliest reference was on GZA's Pass The Bone.

PiRo
Son of Masta Killa.

Popa Wu
The father of Wu-offshoots Shacronz and Free Murda and an expert on the philosophy of the Five-Percent Nation, Popa Wu can be heard giving teachings on Wu-Tang tracks such as "North Star" (Raekwon), "Black Jesus", "All That I Got Is You" (Ghostface Killah), "The Blessing", and "Wu-Revolution".

He released a solo album titled Visions of the 10th Chamber in 2000, which was effectively a compilation of Wu-affiliated artists (including La the Darkman, Method Man, & Ol' Dirty Bastard) with regular interjections from Popa Wu himself. In 2008, he released Visions of the 10th Chamber Part II, a second compilation composed of a big collection of artists with Dj Nino Carta and Dlah. Popa Wu was featured on Older Gods Pt. 2 from Masta Killa's second LP, Made in Brooklyn and on the track "Return of the North Star" from Raekwon's Only Built 4 Cuban Linx... Pt. II. At the public premiere of Wu: The Story of the Wu-Tang in NYC, he mentioned that he is planning to publish a book. Before his death, he running his label Popa Wu Records out of Brooklyn, NY.

Popa Wu died at 63 in December, 2019.

Prodigal Sunn

Remedy 

Remedy is a rapper and hip-hop producer. He is known for being the first white and the first Jewish rapper to be affiliated with the Wu-Tang Clan. He owns and runs Code Red Entertainment, his label which released Cappadonna's The Struggle album. He also served as executive producer on Inspectah Deck's album Manifesto. Remedy has produced and been featured on various works for ESPN. He released a mixtape, It All Comes Down to This. He is the co-executive producer of the Wu-Tang Killa Bees: Return Of The Swarm album.

Sav Killz 

Sav Killz is an emcee, writer, and rapper. He got his start as part of the Wu-Tang Clan cypher and was connected to Popa Wu, learning how to rap at 36 Chambers Studio and Restoration Plaza.

Shabazz the Disciple

Shaka Amazulu the 7th 
MC and Producers from United Kingdom, London,  closely associated to Black Knights and Northstar from West Coast Killa Beez. Forefront and Part of the project, and experimental group School of the Gifted alongside other affiliates such as Solomon Childs, Napoleon from Wu-Syndicates, Dexter Wiggle and Rubbabandz. He is also in the group Gen-3 with Holy Smokes from Ancient COINS. Snippets and leaks suggest Shaka is sitting on a number of unreleased Wu-Tang affiliate projects and songs and some have been put out via his Black Stone of Mecca imprints.

Shyheim

Silkski

Solomon Childs 
Solomon Childs is a Staten Island artist closely associated with various members of the Wu. Backed by the RZA in combination with his brother Divine (CEO of Wu Music Group). He released his debut album entitled The Voice of the People in 2009.

Solomon Childs released single "As The World Turns" on Canadian Hip Hop Label UIYB Records (founded by Lenny Diko) in 2010.

A close associate of Cappadonna and Remedy, he was once part of Theodore Unit before going completely solo. He originally rapped under the moniker Killa Bamz, and has continued releasing albums with features by numerous affiliates, as well as forming his own label. Solomon is part of the group and experimental project with other Wu-Tang affiliates called School of the Gifted as his alter ego Red Heroin. In 2013, Solomon Childs appeared on the single Bang To The Death by Mike ADHD featuring Ruste Juxx, Kromeatose, Fes Taylor and Solomon Childs.

Streetlife

Sun God
Sun God is Ghostface Killah's eldest son; he made his debut with the song Man Up on Put it on the Line in 2005. He appears twice on his album More Fish in "Miguel Sanchez" and "Street Opera". He also appears on "Yapp City" and "Paisely Darts" from Ghost's album The Big Doe Rehab, "Dogs Of War" on Fishscale and "Gunshowers" on the Wu-Massacre album. He is signed to Starks Enterprises, his father's label.

Timbo King

TrūVillain
TrūVillain is a hip hop duo containing rappers iNTeLL (the son of U-God and nephew of Method Man) and D1C3, a Long Island, hip hop artist who started working with iNTeLL while engineering one of his projects. After doing multiple collaborations, the artists then created the duo and eventually released their first official project under the 'TrūVillain' name.

Warcloud
Born Anthony Creston Brown (September 20, 1971), Warcloud is a west coast Wu-Tang Clan affiliate and former member of the group Black Knights (when he was known as Holocaust, the Sign of Hell's Winter).

He is known by the aliases Alcatraz and Robot Tank. He has released five albums to date: Nightmares That Surface from Shallow Sleep, Smuggling Booze in the Graveyard, Blue Sky Black Death Presents: The Holocaust in collaboration with production duo Blue Sky Black Death, Theatre of Pain, in collaboration with American Poets 2099, and Holocaust as Robot Tank - The Signs of Hells Winter. Since 2019 he has been releasing albums independently online.

Young Justice 
Young Justice (born September 20, 1998), GZA's son, first appeared on the intro to his father's Legend of the Liquid Sword album and then released a cover of his father's "Killa Hills 10304". Also appears with Lord Jamar's and Ol' Dirty Bastard's sons, on Lord Jamar's The 5% Album. Signed to Liquid Swords Entertainment and hoping to release an album soon, he is currently pursuing education.

Young Dirty Bastard
Young Dirty Bastard is Ol' Dirty Bastard's eldest son. He toured with the Wu-Tang Clan during their 2007 tours. Under the guidance of his uncle, RZA, he has recorded three mixtapes. He was also featured on Brand Nubian member Lord Jamar's debut solo album The 5% Album, on the track "Young Godz", together with GZA's son Young Justice and Lord Jamar's son Young Lord. Young Dirty Bastard released his first album in 2011 entitled Food Stamp Celebrity Vol. 1.

He released his single Welfare on November 15, 2011. He continues to tour with the Wu-Tang Clan, spreading the legacy of his father, O.D.B. He is featured on Gore Elohim's album "Electric Lucifer". YDB also was featured in Mike ADHD's "Frag Out" music video. As of 2022, Young Dirty Bastard continues to tour with the Wu-Tang Clan, with featured appearances on the New York State of Mind tour alongside Nas and Busta Rhymes.

Singers

Allah Real
An Al Green-style singer who was featured on RZA's Birth of a Prince. He made appearances on Ghostface Killah's The Pretty Toney Album, Masta Killa's debut No Said Date as well as both Mathematics albums. He released his mixtape Real Estate in 2005 through CHAMBERMUSIK. He was born on December 29, 1955, and died on March 14, 2018, aged 62.

Blue Raspberry

Jamie Sommers
A female MC who was signed to RZA's Razor Sharp label. First heard on Ghostface Killah's Ironman album, and later on RZA's Bobby Digital projects.

Makeba Mooncycle
A solo artist affiliated with Sunz of Man. Her first collaboration was with Sunz of Man on the Five Deadly Venom mixtape called We Can't Be Touched, produced by Ray Rolls and Tony Touch. Other tracks she appears on include "Fire" with Royal Fam, produced by Arabian Knight, and "Doing Our Thang" produced by Joe Loopz on Sunz of Man's album.

She was asked by RZA to work with Tekitha and other female singers affiliated with Wu-Tang to work on a "Black Shampoo Project", but nothing ever materialized. She has recorded three projects: E.A.R.T.H. P.O.W.E.R. (2004), Balance (2005), and Throwback Classics (2005).

Selima Young  
 
Singer-Songwriter/MC
Selima Young “Say/A.K.A “Wonda Woman” was discovered by Ghostface Killah after she sang a cappella for him in Atlanta,GA. He took her demo to RZA who later made her his official songwriter for several years. She worked on his single “Tragedy” for the “Rhyme and Reason” movie soundtrack, “Wu Revolution” featuring Popa Wu, Uncle Pete and Blue Raspberry on “Wutang Forever”, ”Skrilla” by Old Dirty Bastard and many other projects. She was also assigned the duty of writing the debut albums for Blue Raspberry and Tekitha but the projects were never completed. She is featured on Cappadonnas’ classic album “Hook Off” and released a mixtape “Selima Young as Wonda Woman Underestimated” hosted by Dj Flipcyide

Suga Bang Bang 
Reggae artist who appeared on the Ghost Dog: The Way of the Samurai - The Album compilation and is affiliated with the new United Kingdom clique. Performed the chorus of "In the Hood" from the Wu-Tang Clan's Iron Flag album. He was on "Cameo Afro" with Big Daddy Kane & GZA from The RZA Presents: Afro Samurai OST. Is featured on the track "Cold Outside" on Raekwon's Only Built 4 Cuban Linx... Pt. II.

Tash Mahogany
Model, actress, and musician who was discovered by Berretta 9 a.k.a. Kinetic of Killarmy. Featured on several Killarmy projects, she was later introduced to the RZA around the recording of Iron Flag album.

RZA featured her on the Birth Of A Prince album, Raekwon's OBFCLII, the Afro Samurai: Resurrection soundtrack, George Clinton's George Clinton and His Gangsters of Love, and Wu-Tang Clan's 8 Diagrams album. She signed a production deal with the RZA and is currently working on an album.

Tekitha

Producers

4th Disciple

Arabian Knight

Bronze Nazareth

Cilvaringz

John the Baptist AKA BAPGOD
Born as John Hitchman Jr., he has produced albums for GZA, Killah Priest, U-God and Royal Fam, Sunz of man, Ol Dirty Bastard, RZA, Olori Manns,  . He is currently managing his own  company, "Deadly Venoms Productions"/ BAPGOD RECORDS.

Mathematics

Popsoundz
A producer for the Universal Zu Disciples.

RNS
A producer whose works include tracks by the UMC's, Shyheim, GP Wu, King Just, Pop da Brown Hornet, and the Gravediggaz. RNS is credited as the one who taught RZA the art of production. He has extended his work into mixing and engineering.

Su-Preme

True Master

Y-Kim the Illfigure
Y-Kim the Illfigure was the primary producer for the Killa Beez group, Royal Fam. Y-Kim achieved a cult-following among Wu-Tang fans. He produced the majority of the Royal Fam's album Black Castle (at first shelved then re-released), as well as many contributions to early albums from Sunz of Man, Killah Priest, Cappadonna, and Buddha Monk.

Associated acts

Nas
In 1995, New York rapper Nas became the first artist with no previous ties to the Wu-Tang to be featured on any Wu-Tang album  namely, Raekwon's Only Built 4 Cuban Linx.... Following this appearance, Nas and Raekwon began to collaborate more often, frequently being featured on the same songs. That same year, Nas and Raekwon appeared on Mobb Deep's The Infamous, on the track "Eye For An Eye"; in 1998, they appeared on the Fat Joe single "John Blaze", alongside Big Pun and Jadakiss. During the same time period, Nas and Method Man co-starred in the film Belly, and collaborated on its soundtrack. Nas was later featured on the Wu-Tang Clan album The W, on the song "Let My Niggas Live", which also featured Raekwon, as well as Inspectah Deck. In 2009, before the release of his anticipated Only Built 4 Cuban Linx... Pt. II, Raekwon stated that Nas was intended to be on the song "Broken Safety" with Jadakiss, but Nas was never able to find time to record. However, Nas was able to appear on Raekwon's fifth solo album titled Shaolin vs. Wu-Tang on the song "Rich and Black" although his verse was from an old mixtape from 2001. In 2022, Nas joined the Wu-Tang Clan and Busta Rhymes for the New York State of Mind tour.

Mobb Deep
In 1995, the same year that Raekwon's debut came out, the Wu-Tang rapper appeared on Mobb Deep's seminal The Infamous; aside from "Eye For An Eye", he and Ghostface Killah appeared on the track "Right Back At You". A year later, Method Man and Raekwon made appearances on separate tracks on the duo's follow-up album, Hell on Earth. In 1997 Mobb Deep member Prodigy and Method Man collaborated on the soundtrack to Bulworth, on the DJ Muggs-produced song "Bulworth", which also featured KRS-One and Kam; in 1998, Prodigy was featured on "The Game", a song from Pete Rock's solo debut Soul Survivor, once again alongside Ghostface Killah and Raekwon. The same year, Prodigy made an appearance on Big Pun's debut album Capital Punishment, on the song "Tres Leches (Triboro Trilogy)", also featuring Inspectah Deck as well as produced by RZA.

Also in 1998, Mobb Deep appeared on Method Man's second album, Tical 2000: Judgement Day, on the song "Play IV Keeps", which was produced by Mobb Deep producer Havoc. 1999 saw Prodigy, Inspectah Deck and U-God appear on the Blondie single, "No Exit", as well as a Raekwon appearance on the duo's third album, Murda Muzik. Havoc later appeared on Raekwon's 2003 album, The Lex Diamond Story, on the song "King of Kings", and in 2006 he produced the song "Somebody Done Fucked Up Now" for Method Man's album 4:21... The Day After while Prodigy and Ghostface would collaborate on the song "Trials of Life" for DJ Green Lantern. More recently Havoc collaborated with the Wu on J. Dilla's posthumous single "24K Rap" alongside Raekwon, and "Evil Deeds" from the Wu-Tang Clan compilation album Chamber Music. Raekwon also leaked a 2009 song with Mobb Deep called "Road to Riches". Havoc also made a guest appearance as a producer and rapper on the song "Your World, My World" which was a bonus iTunes track off of Raekwon's fifth studio album Shaolin vs. Wu-Tang.

The L.O.X.
Jadakiss, part of New York-based group, the L.O.X., first collaborated with a member of the Wu-Tang Clan in 1998 on the single "John Blaze" with Raekwon. While the collaboration led to associations with Nas and Fat Joe as well, Jada's group began to collaborate with the Wu-Tang on a more regular basis. L.O.X. member Sheek Louch collaborated with Method Man and Redman on Ryde or Die Vol. 2 in 2001, on the track "Two Tears in a Bucket". He also appeared on Raekwon's third album The Lex Diamond Story in 2003; in 2004, Jadakiss appeared on "Run", the RZA-produced single from Ghostface Killah's The Pretty Toney Album, which also featured the song "Metal Lungies", a collaboration with the other two L.O.X. members, Styles P and Sheek Louch. The following year, Ghostface appeared on Louch's album, After Taxes. In 2006, Sheek made a return appearance on Ghostface's Fishscale, and Raekwon appeared alongside Jadakiss and others on Hi-Tek's album Hi-Teknology 2: The Chip, on the song "Where It Started At". Ghostface Killah appeared on L.O.X. member Styles P's 2007 album, Super Gangster (Extraordinary Gentleman), and Styles was set to appear on Ghostface's Big Doe Rehab, having recorded a version of the song "Tony Sigel A.K.A. Barrel Brothers" with Styles.

In 2009, Jadakiss featured Raekwon and Ghostface Killah on his album The Last Kiss, on the single "Cartel Gathering", and Raekwon featured Jadakiss and Styles P on his album Only Built 4 Cuban Linx II; Sheek Louch and new D-Block addition Bully also appeared on the Method Man, Ghostface Killah and Raekwon album, Wu-Massacre. Inspectah Deck has also stated that he intends to reach out to Jadakiss to appear on his next and final album, The Rebellion. In addition, Ghostface and Sheek Louch have announced a collaboration album called Wu-Block. A joint effort released in 2012, the album is a street orientated sound full-out collabo between the D-Block and Wu groups.

Redman
Method Man and EPMD protégé Redman were signed as solo artists to Def Jam by 1992; their first recorded collaboration was "Double Deuces", a commercial recorded for St. Ides malt liquor. They were also featured on "Got My Mind Made Up", a 2Pac song released on his album All Eyez on Me. With a chemistry based in similar rhyme delivery and stoner humor, their collaboration led to a hit single, "How High". Method Man and Redman went on to make two albums as a duo: Blackout! and Blackout 2, with RZA and Mathematics contributing production to both projects. The successful partnership of Redman and Method led to a major studio film ("How High"), and a short-lived sitcom ("Method & Red"). Method Man and Redman were frequently featured together on other rapper's songs, such as LL Cool J's "4, 3, 2, 1" single in 1997. While best known for his partnership with Method Man, Redman has collaborated with the rest of the clan on several occasions. Redman was featured on the track "Redbull" from Wu-Tang Clan's The W in 2000, and on "Troublemakers" from Ghostface Killah's Apollo Kids in 2010. Redman has toured with Ghostface Killah and Raekwon, and was brought on stage by the entire Wu-Tang Clan as a surprise guest during their sets at 2013's Coachella and Bonnaroo music festivals.

Due to his constant visibility next to Method Man, and his tendency to wear Wu-Tang related clothing on stage, some fans have confused Redman for being more than just an affiliate of the Wu-Tang Clan. Redman raised speculation himself when a quote he gave to XXL made headlines in 2010, "I am the last member of Wu Tang, like Method Man he’s a part of Def Squad. Meth has been a part of Def Squad before I was a member. I was like a member. But I was affiliated and I wasn’t signed in, but, I’m definitely—they got my number. Number 11th and I am officially a Wu Tang member right now." When asked to respond, RZA downplayed the notion, stating that although Redman was like family to Wu-Tang, he's more "like a first cousin".

AZ
AZ began his career as an affiliate of Nas. The Brooklyn rapper first recorded with the Wu in 1996, when Raekwon joined him for a RZA-produced remix of his first single, "Doe or Die". In 1998, the rapper linked up with RZA again on the album Pieces of a Man, and in 2005 he featured Raekwon and Ghostface Killah on his album AWOL. In 2009, AZ was featured on the Wu-Tang compilation album Chamber Music, and appeared alongside Raekwon and Ghostface again in 2010 on DJ Kay Slay's album More Than Just a DJ. In 2011, AZ appeared on the title track of Wu-Tang's Legendary Weapons alongside Ghostface Killah and M.O.P. Additionally, in 2013, he was featured on the remix to Raekwon's track "'86" from the compilation album Lost Jewlry. In 2014, AZ made his most extensive collaboration with a Wu-Tang member to date, appearing on five cuts from Ghostface's 36 Seasons concept album. AZ played a major role in the album's narrative as a partner in crime from the past to Ghostface's character that was released from jail after nine years.

Busta Rhymes
New York rapper Busta Rhymes first collaborated with the Wu-Tang Clan when he and Method Man appeared together on the 1995 remix to the Boyz II Men single "Vibin. In 1996 he released a remix to his single "Woo-Hah!! (Got You All In Check)" featuring Ol' Dirty Bastard, and was featured on the soundtrack to Space Jam with Method Man. In 2000 Ghostface Killah and Raekwon appeared on Busta's album Anarchy, on the song "The Heist", and Busta appeared with Raekwon on Easy Mo Bee's solo album, Odyssey 2000: Now or Never, and guested on The W on the song "The Monument". Busta later contributed to Method Man's album Tical 0: The Prequel. As executive producer, Busta helped Raekwon create Cuban Linx II and provided the rapper with a link to Dr. Dre. Raekwon appeared on Busta's 2006 album The Big Bang, on the Dr. Dre/Erick Sermon-produced song "Goldmine", and Busta in turn appeared on the Dr. Dre-produced "About Me" from 2009's Only Built 4 Cuban Linx II. In addition, Busta later appeared on Capone-N-Noreaga's 2010 album The War Report 2: Report the War, their first on Raekwon's label Ice H2O Records, on the song "The Oath" which also featured Raekwon. Busta also appeared on Ghostface Killah's album Apollo Kids later that year, and appeared in 2011 on Raekwon's fifth solo album Shaolin vs. Wu-Tang. On Busta's 2020 album Extinction Level Event 2: The Wrath of God, the song "Slow Flow" is a collaboration with Ol' Dirty Bastard. In 2022, Busta joined the Wu-Tang Clan and Nas for the New York State of Mind tour.

Kool G Rap
Kool G Rap began appearing with the Wu-Tang starting in 1999, on the single "Cakes", produced by and featuring RZA for the soundtrack to Ghost Dog: The Way of the Samurai. He had always been held in high regard amongst Clan members, particularly RZA, Ghost, and Rae. In 2003, G Rap appeared on Inspectah Deck's album The Movement, and went on to make appearances on the Ghostface Killah/Trife da God joint album Put it on the Line, and Raekwon's EP Dope on the Table in the years following. In 2009, he was featured on RZA's Afro Samurai Resurrection soundtrack, and Wu-Tang Chamber Music. In 2012, Kool G Rap was featured alongside Wu-Tang Clan members on the soundtrack to RZA's film The Man with the Iron Fists, on the track "Rivers of Blood". In 2014, Kool G Rap appeared on three cuts from Ghostface's concept album 36 Seasons.

MF DOOM

The underground rapper/producer MF DOOM's first collaboration with the Wu-Tang Clan was in 2005, when he appeared with the RZA on "Biochemical Equation" (which RZA also produced), from the compilation album Wu-Tang Meets the Indie Culture. When DOOM anonymously submitted a beat tape for Ghostface Killah, several of his tracks were released for Ghostface's 2006 albums Fishscale and More Fish, including the song "9 Milli Bros", which featured the Wu-Tang Clan in its entirety. DOOM also provided production for Masta Killa's 2006 album Made in Brooklyn. An album-long collaboration with Ghostface Killah was rumored for several years, and various songs leaked that reportedly were recorded for the project, which was to be entitled either Ghostface Meets Metalface or Swift & Changeable. The project has not yet surfaced, but in July 2009 Ghostface reported having recorded his parts for the record and said he was simply waiting for Doom to finish his parts. Since More Fish, several new collaborations by the two have surfaced, including "Chinatown Wars" (from the soundtrack to Grand Theft Auto: Chinatown Wars), "Angeles", "The Mask", and the J. Dilla-produced "Sniper Elite" and "Murder Goons". Additionally, Raekwon appeared on DOOM's album Born Like This, with Ghostface Killah providing guest vocals on that album's song "ANGELZ". Ghostface Killah and DOOM released the track "Victory Laps" and in early 2013; Ghostface announced that the collaboration album Swift & Changeable was on track to be released by the end of that year, but it was never released due to being leaked online several weeks in advance.

Easy Mo Bee

In the late 1980s, future Wu-Tang Clan co-founders RZA and GZA were signed under different monikers to Cold Chillin' Records, the label home of Big Daddy Kane and Kool G. Rap, among others. During their tenure, producer Easy Mo Bee provided RZA (under the name Prince Rakeem) with his first hit single, "Ooh I Love You Rakeem", and produced much of GZA's (under the alias The Genius) first album, Words From the Genius. Around this time, according to the Wu-Tang Manual, RZA accredits Easy Mo Bee with mentoring him and providing equipment for RZA to continue practicing beatmaking.

In 1994, after linking up with Bad Boy Entertainment, Mo Bee began producing a fair share of Ready to Die, The Notorious B.I.G.'s debut album. The only rap feature on the album was Method Man, who appeared on the Easy Mo Bee-produced "The What". 1998 saw the producer produce for RZA once again, on the Ras Kass song "The End", and Wu-Tang member Raekwon was featured on Easy's solo album, Odyssey 2000: Now or Never alongside Busta Rhymes on the song "Let's Make a Toast". Seven years later, Mo Bee would go on to co-produce a track alongside RZA on the group's fifth group album, 8 Diagrams. Wu-Element producer True Master has also credited Easy Mo Bee with teaching him certain production tips, such as snare, hi-hat and volume change techniques.

Pete Rock
Like Easy Mo Bee, New York, producer Pete Rock first began his association with the Wu-Tang before it was formally founded  by playing mentor to RZA, then under the moniker Prince Rakeem. In the book "The Wu-Tang Manual", RZA admits to effectively stealing equipment from the successful producer, borrowing and never returning an MPC. Pete first produced for the Wu-Tang when its members Ghostface Killah, Raekwon, Inspectah Deck and Method Man made appearances on his 1998 album Soul Survivor. The following year, the producer provided beats for Raekwon's second album Immobilarity, Inspectah Deck's debut album Uncontrolled Substance, and Wu members RZA and GZA appeared on Pete's 2004 follow-up solo album Soul Survivor II. Since then the frequency of Pete Rock's collaborations with the Wu-Tang have increased, as he provided production for Ghostface Killah's two 2006 solo albums, Fishscale and More Fish (including the unreleased song, "Chunky"); Masta Killa's 2006 second album Made in Brooklyn; the Raekwon- and Masta Killa-featuring song "PJ's" from his own third solo album, NY's Finest; the single "A Yo" from Method Man & Redman's Blackout! 2; the song "Sonny's Missing", from Raekwon's Only Built 4 Cuban Linx... Pt. II; and the track "How You Like Me Baby?" from Ghostface Killah's Apollo Kids.

Kanye West

In 2000, Kanye West received some of his first major production placements on former Bad Boy producer D-Dot's debut album, Tell 'Em Why U Madd, including the song "Ghetto", which featured Raekwon. In 2001, West produced the bulk of Jay-Z's successful and highly praised album The Blueprint, implementing an augmented version of a technique pioneered by RZA; Kanye has since revealed that the beats he and fellow Roc producer Just Blaze produced were originally created for Ghostface Killah, before announcing that Ghostface inspired his sound and style. During the recording sessions for West's 2004 debut The College Dropout, then-Roc-A-Fella artist Ol' Dirty Bastard recorded a chorus and backing vocals for the song "Keep the Receipt", which was left off the album but released on a mixtape.

In 2006, Kanye was featured on the remix to Ghostface Killah's hit single, "Back Like That". In 2010, West and Raekwon collaborated again on the Kanye-produced remix to Justin Bieber's single "Runaway Love". The beat, produced by West, playfully utilized elements from "Wu Tang Clan Ain't Nuthing ta Fuck Wit". Following up on the song, Raekwon guested on several tracks cut from West's My Beautiful Dark Twisted Fantasy, which were released as songs in the producer's weekly G.O.O.D. Fridays series. On the album's release, Raekwon was featured on the track "Gorgeous" alongside West and Kid Cudi; in addition, RZA co-produced the song "Dark Fantasy" with West and producer No I.D., and appeared on the song "So Appalled" alongside Jay-Z, Pusha T and CyHi da Prince. RZA also produced the song "New Day" with West off the Kanye West & Jay-Z's collaborative effort Watch the Throne. More recently, both Raekwon and Ghostface Killah were featured on the G.O.O.D. Music compilation album, Cruel Summer. In 2012, he and RZA collaborated on the track "White Dress" for the soundtrack for The Man with the Iron Fists.

DJ Muggs
West Coast producer and Cypress Hill co-founder DJ Muggs began collaborating with the Wu-Tang in 1995, when RZA and U-God appeared on the RZA-produced Cypress Hill song "Killa Hill Niggas" from the album III: Temples of Boom. In 1997, Muggs produced the Method Man/Prodigy collaboration "Bulworth". In addition, RZA and GZA appeared on his album Soul Assassins I, and GZA appeared on the 2000 followup, Soul Assassins II. In return, Muggs produced a song on GZA's 2002 album Legend of the Liquid Sword, which led to Muggs and GZA recording the 2005 joint album Grandmasters. That same year Muggs produced the song "Black Opera" for Skillz, which featured Raekwon. Additionally, GZA appeared on the DJ Muggs-produced Planet Asia album Pain Language in 2008. In 2009, Raekwon spoke about recording new material with DJ Muggs, presumably for his album Cuban Linx II, but nothing surfaced until he appeared on the song "Chase Manhattan" from the DJ Muggs/Ill Bill album Kill Devil Hills.

B-Nasty
Featured heavily on the GZAs official DJ, DJ Symphonys Wu-Invasion Mixtape Series

DJ Symphony

J-Love
The self-proclaimed "King of Mixtapes", he is responsible for most of the Wu-Tang affiliated mixtapes and is the official tour DJ for Ghostface Killah.

Other artists
Ghostface Killah's Fishscale also featured work by underground sensation and Detroit, Michigan, producer J. Dilla, who died shortly after the release. However, just as the producer's music has continued to surface in other artists' projects, several productions Dilla created for Raekwon made the final cut of the rapper's 2009 album. The year 2009 witnessed the release of the long-delayed, highly anticipated Only Built 4 Cuban Linx... Pt. II. The album made heavy use of longtime and short-term Wu-Tang associates, featuring frequent collaborators Pete Rock, Erick Sermon and Busta Rhymes while cementing the associate status of newer collaborators: namely, Beanie Sigel, J. Dilla, The Alchemist and Dr. Dre, all of whom have worked—in a limited capacity—with the Wu-Tang Clan previously.

As of 2010, the number of Wu-Tang affiliates has grown further: Capone-N-Noreaga, a rap duo from Queens, New York City, signed with Raekwon's Ice H2O Records on February 18, 2010, and enlisted the Wu-Tang rapper to serve as an executive producer of their latest album, The War Report 2. Bun B has also appeared on several songs with Wu-Tang members in 2009–10: after being featured on Method Man & Redman's Blackout! 2, Bun made appearances on Raekwon's Only Built 4 Cuban Linx II (Gold Edition), made up of tracks cut from the original product, and appeared on Redman's latest album Reggie alongside Redman and Method Man.

Since 2009, RZA has made a series of appearances alongside Ohio blues rock band The Black Keys: "Dollaz & Sense" and "Tellin' Me Things" from the Dame Dash-sponsored collaborative album Blakroc, and the single "The Baddest Man Alive" from The Man with the Iron Fists soundtrack. Pharoahe Monch appeared alongside RZA and others on the 1999 "Wake Up Show Anthem", most of which uses the beat from "Airwaves", an interlude from RZA's album Bobby Digital in Stereo. Monch also featured Method Man on the remix to his 1999 single, "Simon Says"; he also collaborated with RZA on "Dollaz & Sense", and appears with Ghostface Killah and M.O.P. on the soundtrack for The Man with the Iron Fists, on the track "Black Out".

References

External links
 WuTang-Corp.com
 Wu-Tang Family Solo Artists and Family Groups at 
 Wu-International.com

Hip hop collectives
Five percenters
Wu-Tang Clan affiliates
 
20th-century American rappers
21st-century American rappers
American hip hop groups